The 1936 Women's Western Open was a golf competition held at Topeka Country Club, which was the 7th edition of the event. Opal Hill won the championship in match play competition by defeating Mrs. Charles Dennehy in the final match, 3 and 2.

Women's Western Open
Golf in Kansas
Women's Western Open
Women's Western Open
Women's Western Open
Women's sports in Kansas